Foresight Solar Fund is a large British investment trust dedicated to investments in solar energy. Established in October 2013, the company is listed on the London Stock Exchange and is a constituent of the FTSE 250 Index. The chairman is Alex Ohlssen.

References

External links
  Official site

Financial services companies established in 2013
Investment trusts of the United Kingdom
Companies listed on the London Stock Exchange